The Norwegian Sportsperson of the Year is an annual award given by the Norwegian Association of Sports Journalists.

List of winners

References

 Sportsperson of the Year laureates
 
 
 
 
 
 
 

National sportsperson-of-the-year trophies and awards
Norwegian sports trophies and awards
Norwegian sportspeople
Awards established in 1948
1948 establishments in Norway